The 2023 UCI Track Cycling Nations Cup (also known as the Tissot UCI Track Cycling Nations Cup for sponsorship reasons) was a multi-race tournament over a track cycling season. It was the second series of the UCI Track Cycling Nations Cup organised by the UCI.

Series 
Three rounds are scheduled:
 February 23–26 in Jakarta, Indonesia.
 March 14–17 in Cairo, Canada.
 April 20–23 in Milton, Canada.

References 

Nations Cup
UCI Track Cycling Nations Cup